Hell or High Water is a 2016 American neo-Western crime drama film directed by David Mackenzie and written by Taylor Sheridan. It follows two brothers (Chris Pine and Ben Foster) who carry out a series of bank robberies to save their family ranch, while being pursued by two Texas Rangers (Jeff Bridges and Gil Birmingham). It was the final film produced by OddLot Entertainment due to its dissolution in 2015.

Hell or High Water premiered at the Un Certain Regard section of the Cannes Film Festival on May 16, 2016, and was theatrically released in the United States on August 12, 2016. It received critical acclaim, particularly for Pine, Foster, and Bridges' performances, Sheridan's screenplay, and the editing. It grossed $37.9 million on a $12 million budget. The American Film Institute selected it as one of its 10 movies of the year, and it was nominated for numerous awards, including four Oscar nominations: Best Picture, Best Supporting Actor (Bridges), Best Original Screenplay, and Best Editing.

Plot
In West Texas, brothers Toby and Tanner Howard rob two branches of the Texas Midlands Bank. Though the robberies are well-planned, Tanner's wild nature leads him to take unnecessary risks, frustrating Toby. Back at their family ranch, they bury their getaway car in a pit with a backhoe. Their mother has died after a long illness, leaving their ranch in debt because of a reverse mortgage provided by the Texas Midlands Bank, which would lead to foreclosure if not settled. Meanwhile, oil has been discovered on their land, and Toby is determined to ensure a comfortable life for his estranged sons.

Two Texas Rangers, Marcus Hamilton and Alberto Parker, are assigned to the case. Hamilton, who is close to retirement, investigates the robberies and quickly determines the brothers' methods and personalities. Meanwhile, Tanner robs another bank, while Toby unknowingly waits at a nearby diner. They then take the stolen money to an Indian casino in Oklahoma to be laundered, where Toby has the casino convert their gambling winnings into a check made out to the Texas Midlands Bank. With untraceable funds and gambling as a cover for how they were acquired, the brothers head back to Texas.

Hamilton and Parker stake out another branch of the Texas Midlands Bank, but find nothing. Hamilton figures a pattern to the bank robberies and determines the next target, so Parker and he head to the site of the next robbery. Pressed for time, the brothers proceed with the heist despite the bank being crowded. A shootout ensues when a security guard and an armed civilian fire at the brothers, causing Tanner to kill both of them. During the shootout, Toby is shot in the back.

The brothers race out of town with the local posse in pursuit. After gaining some distance, Tanner stops and fires an automatic weapon at the posse, with his fire superiority forcing them to retreat. The brothers then split up; Toby takes the money using another vehicle, while Tanner creates a diversion. He draws the lawmen to a desert mountain ridge where he takes potshots at the police with a rifle, killing Parker in the process. Distraught, Hamilton uses a local resident’s knowledge of the area to circle behind Tanner and fatally shoot him.

Simultaneously, Toby manages to pass through a police checkpoint without incident, and launders the stolen cash at the casino, where he sees the news report of his brother's death. He takes the casino's check to the bank just in time to avoid the ranch's foreclosure and deeds the ranch into a family trust.

Following his retirement, Hamilton visits his former office and learns that Toby has been cleared as a suspect, as his record is clean and he has no motive since his new oil wells earn more in a month than the total stolen in all of the robberies together. The money from the ranch's oil wells is deposited at the Texas Midlands Bank, which refuses to cooperate with the investigation for fear of losing management of the family's trust fund. Despite the lack of evidence, Hamilton remains certain that Toby was indeed the second bank robber.

Hamilton confronts Toby at the ranch, and wishes to know the reason behind the robberies. Toby explains that he has resolved to not let poverty affect his sons like it affected Tanner and him. Hamilton tells Toby he holds him responsible for the death of Parker, and the tension in their conversation builds as a clear prelude to an impending violent shootout.  They are interrupted, though, when Toby's ex-wife and children arrive. As Hamilton departs, Toby suggests they meet again soon to "finish the conversation" and "bring you some peace." Hamilton replies that he would like to meet again and maybe he will "bring some peace" to Toby before leaving.

Cast

Production
On April 18, 2012, Deadline reported that Sidney Kimmel Entertainment (SKE) had acquired the heist film Comancheria, written by Taylor Sheridan, which SKE would finance and produce with Peter Berg of Film 44. It is the second installment of Sheridan's trilogy of "the modern-day American frontier". At Cinemacon 2016 in Las Vegas, a standee was presented for the film, revealing that the title had been changed to Hell or High Water. Berg was potentially attached to direct the film. Endgame Entertainment and Focus Features were also among the studios bidding for the project against SKE. The script won the best Black List script in 2012. On April 2, 2015,  Jeff Bridges was announced to be set to star, while Chris Pine and Ben Foster were also in talks to join, and David Mackenzie was set to direct the film. On May 4, 2015, Pine and Foster were confirmed to play brothers in the film, who commit bank robberies to save their family's farm in West Texas, while Bridges would play a Texas Ranger set to catch the brothers. CBS Films acquired the US rights to the film, which was produced by Sidney Kimmel of Sidney Kimmel Entertainment, Peter Berg of Film 44, Carla Hacken of SKE, and Julie Yorn of LBI, with Gigi Pritzker, Bill Lischak, Michael Nathanson, Rachel Shane, John Penotti, Bruce Toll and Braden Aftergood as executive producers. Sidney Kimmel Entertainment developed the project with Film 44, and OddLot Entertainment co-produced and co-finance the film along with SKE.

Filming

Although the film's plot takes place in West Texas, filming took place in eastern New Mexico. Principal photography on the film began on May 26, 2015, in Clovis, New Mexico. Filming also took place in other New Mexico communities such as Portales and Tucumcari. Some rural scenes were filmed in the vast and sparsely populated ranch country of Quay and Guadalupe Counties of New Mexico, including scenic shots of Alamogordo Valley south of Luciano Mesa. Filming wrapped on July 8, 2015.

Release
Hell or High Water premiered at the 69th Cannes Film Festival on May 16, 2016. It began a limited release on August 12, 2016, in the United States, followed by an expansion on August 19, and a wide release on August 26. The film opened in the UK and Ireland on September 9, and in New Zealand on October 21, 2016.

Reception

Box office
Hell or High Water grossed $27 million in the United States and Canada and $10.9 million in other territories, for a worldwide total of $37.9 million, against a production budget of $12 million.

In North America, the film grossed $621,329 from 32 theaters in its opening weekend, for a $19,417 per theater average. The following weekend, Hell or High Water expanded to 472 theaters, grossing $2.7 million (a per theater average of $5,709). The film began its wide release at 909 theaters on August 26, and grossed $3.7 million over the weekend, finishing 12th at the box office.

Critical response

Hell or High Water received universal acclaim, with many praising the film as revitalizing the Western genre. On Rotten Tomatoes, the film has an approval rating of 96% based on 284 reviews, with an average rating of 8.50/10. The website's critical consensus reads, "Hell or High Water offers a solidly crafted, well-acted Western heist thriller that eschews mindless gunplay in favor of confident pacing and full-bodied characters." On Metacritic, the film has a score of 88 out of 100, based on reviews from 47 critics, indicating "universal acclaim". Audiences polled by CinemaScore gave the film an average grade of "A−" on an A+ to F scale. 

Richard Roeper of the Chicago Sun Times gave the film four out of four stars, saying, "In ways large and small, Hell or High Water is a movie so beautiful and harsh and elegiac and knowing, the moment it was over was the moment I wanted to see it again." IGN reviewer Samantha Ladwig gave the film a 9/10, saying "Hell or High Water surprises with its complex narrative, stuns with its cinematography, and makes up for this summer's shortcomings."  Tom Stempel of Creative Screenwriting praised Hell or High Water as "a fresh, smart, bank robbery-character study and one of the best screenplays so far this year."

Accolades

Hell or High Water received four nominations at the Academy Awards, including Best Picture, Best Supporting Actor for Bridges, Best Original Screenplay and Best Film Editing.

References

External links

 
 
 
 
 
 

2016 films
2016 crime action films
2016 crime drama films
2010s heist films
2016 Western (genre) films
American crime action films
American crime drama films
American heist films
American Western (genre) films
CBS Films films
Films about bank robbery
Films about brothers
Films about the Texas Ranger Division
Films directed by David Mackenzie (director)
Films produced by Peter Berg
Films produced by Sidney Kimmel
Films scored by Nick Cave
Films scored by Warren Ellis (musician)
Films set in Oklahoma
Films set in Texas
Films shot in New Mexico
Films with screenplays by Taylor Sheridan
Lionsgate films
Neo-Western films
Sidney Kimmel Entertainment films
2010s English-language films
2010s American films